Devonte Fields is a Canadian football defensive lineman for the Edmonton Eskimos of the Canadian Football League (CFL). He previously played college football for TCU, Trinity Valley Community College, and Louisville.

Early years
Fields attended Arlington Martin High School in Arlington, Texas. As a senior, he had 73 tackles, 13 sacks and two interceptions. He committed to Texas Christian University (TCU) to play college football.

College career
As a freshman at TCU in 2012, Fields started all 13 games and had 53 tackles, 10 sacks and an interception. He was named the Big 12 Defensive Freshman of the Year. He played in only three games as a sophomore in 2013 due to injury and suspension. In August 2014 he was removed from TCU over numerous incidents that had occurred over the previous months.

Fields attended Trinity Valley Community College in 2014. He played in 12 games and had 61 tackles and 6.5 sacks. He transferred to the University of Louisville in 2015. During his first year at Louisville, Fields started all 13 games, recording 64 tackles and 11 sacks.

Professional career
Fields was signed to the Edmonton Eskimos' practice squad on July 31, 2017, and is listed as a defensive lineman.

References

External links
Louisville Cardinals bio
TCU Horned Frogs bio

Living people
Players of American football from Fort Worth, Texas
American football linebackers
Canadian football defensive linemen
American players of Canadian football
TCU Horned Frogs football players
Trinity Valley Cardinals football players
Louisville Cardinals football players
Edmonton Elks players
1993 births